John Morgan (1929–1988) was a Welsh journalist and broadcaster.  Morgan worked for the BBC as a presenter on programmes such as Panorama, and wrote for the  New Statesman, The Spectator and The Sunday Times, among other publications.

Morgan was born in Treboeth, Swansea, and attended the University College of Swansea.

When Morgan was diagnosed with terminal cancer, he worked with Channel 4 on Concerning Cancer: the Enemy Within, a documentary of his experience; the film won the 1989 Grierson Award. A collection of his articles was published posthumously in 1993.

Works
John Morgan's Wales (Christopher Davies, 1993)

References

External links

1929 births
1988 deaths
Welsh journalists